Burton Cecil Downing (February 5, 1885 – January 1, 1929) was an American racing cyclist who competed in the early twentieth century. An all round cycling talent, he competed in Cycling at the 1904 Summer Olympics and won two gold medals in the 25 mile and the 2 mile, three silver medals in the ¼ mile, ⅓ mile and mile and a bronze medal in the ½ mile race.

In later years Downing served as president of the George B. Spearin, Inc. construction company. It was whilst he was serving in this role that he contracted pneumonia which developed into meningitis. He died in Red Bank, New Jersey.

See also
List of multiple Olympic medalists at a single Games

References

1885 births
1929 deaths
American male cyclists
Cyclists at the 1904 Summer Olympics
Olympic gold medalists for the United States in cycling
Olympic silver medalists for the United States in cycling
Olympic bronze medalists for the United States in cycling
Medalists at the 1904 Summer Olympics
19th-century American people
20th-century American people